Sue Katherine Brown (born 1948) is a retired American Foreign Service officer who served as U.S. Ambassador to Montenegro from 2011 to 2015. She also served as chargé d'affaires in Ghana.  She retired from the Foreign Service in 2015.  She was the first African-American to hold the post.

While ambassador, Brown coordinated American assistance twice following natural disasters. Both times she arranged for needed services after record snowfalls including food, fuel and medical attention.

References

1948 births
Living people
21st-century American women
Ambassadors of the United States to Ghana
Ambassadors of the United States to Montenegro
American women ambassadors